Club Bella Vista is an Argentine football club located in the city of Bahía Blanca, in Buenos Aires Province. The team currently plays in Torneo Regional Federal Amateur, the regionalised 4th level of the Argentine football league system.

The most notable player in the club history is Alfio Basile, who went on to become manager of the Argentina national football team, leading them to two Copa América titles.

References

External links
Bella Vista blog

Association football clubs established in 1921
Football clubs in Buenos Aires Province
1921 establishments in Argentina